The NWA Austra-Asian Tag Team Championship was the top tag team professional wrestling title in the Australian World Championship Wrestling promotion from 1972 through the promotion's 1978 closure.

WCW joined the National Wrestling Alliance in August 1969, but still recognized the IWA World Tag Team Championship as its world title. In 1971, that title was abandoned and this title was established as WCW's new top tag team title.

24 different teams held the championship, combining for 29 individual title reigns.

Title history

See also
Professional wrestling in Australia
World Championship Wrestling

Footnotes

References

National Wrestling Alliance championships
Tag team wrestling championships
World Championship Wrestling (Australia) championships
Professional wrestling in Australia
Intercontinental professional wrestling championships